El Periódico is Spanish for "The Journal" and may refer to:

El Periódico de Catalunya, a Spanish newspaper
El Periódico de Aragón, a Spanish newspaper
El Periódico (Guatemala)
El Periódico (Honduras)

See also